

The Albatros L 79 Kobold was a single-seat German aerobatic aircraft of the 1920s and 1930s. It was a single-bay biplane with unstaggered, equal-span wings that had a symmetrical airfoil intended to ensure performance during inverted flight.

Specifications (L 79)

See also

References
 
 German Aircraft between 1919–1945

Biplanes
Single-engined tractor aircraft
1920s German sport aircraft
L 079
Aerobatic aircraft
Aircraft first flown in 1929